Saint-Sébastien (Limousin: Sent Sebastian) is a commune in the Creuse department in central France.

Geography
The village lies in the middle of the commune, above the right bank of the Abloux, which flows north through the commune.

Population

See also
Communes of the Creuse department

References

Communes of Creuse